Zdzisław Żygulski may refer to:

 Zdzisław Żygulski (literary historian) (1888–1975), Polish literary historian and Germanist; father of the following
 Zdzisław Żygulski (art historian) (1921–2015), Polish art historian, academic and educator; son of the above